The James McKeen Cattell Fellow Award is an award of the Association for Psychological Science given since 1992. The award is named after James McKeen Cattell and "honors  individuals for their lifetime of significant intellectual contributions to the basic science of psychology." As part of APS’s 25th Anniversary, the APS Board of Directors recognized a larger class of James McKeen Cattell Fellows in 2013, identifying them as individuals who have had a profound impact on the field of psychological science over the previous quarter century.”

Awardees 

1992
Aaron T. Beck
Alphonse Chapanis
Anne Anastasi
Donald E. Super
Edward L. Palmer
Edwin A. Fleishman
Fred S. Keller
Gerald R. Patterson
Gerald S. Lesser
John Money
Joseph Wolpe
Martin T. Orne
Nathan H. Azrin
Robert Glaser
Robert M. Gagne
Wallace E. Lambert

1993
Leonard Berkowitz
Sandra Scarr
Urie Bronfenbrenner

1994
Harold W. Stevenson
Julian C. Stanley Jr.

1995
Martin E.P. Seligman
Ward Edwards

1996
Harry C. Triandis
Jacquelynne S. Eccles

1997
Ann Brown
Elizabeth F. Loftus

1998
John B. Carroll
Paul Meehl

1999
Fred E. Fiedler
Robert J. Sternberg

2000
Herbert C. Kelman
Robert M. Guion

2001
Lee J. Cronbach
Robert Rosenthal

2002
Jeanne Brooks-Gunn
Sheldon A. Cohen

2004
Albert Bandura
Michael E. Lamb

2005
E. Mavis Hetherington
Stephen J. Ceci

2006
Edwin A. Locke
Timothy B. Baker

2007
James S. Jackson
Morton Deutsch

2008
Frank L. Schmidt
Howard S. Friedman

2009
Lauren B. Alloy
Lyn Yvonne Abramson
Wilbert J. McKeachie

2010
Alan E. Kazdin
Gary P. Latham

2011
Earl Hunt
J. Frank Yates

2012
David H. Barlow
Geraldine Dawson
Gail S. Goodman

2013
 Nancy E. Adler
 Chris Argyris
 Mihaly Csikszentmihalyi
 Carol S. Dweck
 Irving I. Gottesman
 J. Richard Hackman
 Diane F. Halpern
 Scott O. Lilienfeld
 Karen A. Matthews
 Susan Nolen-Hoeksema
 Elaine F. Walker
 John R. Weisz

2014
 Dante Cicchetti
 Marsha M. Linehan
 Neal Schmitt

2015
 Ian J. Deary
 Ellen Frank (psychologist)
 Roberta M. Golinkoff
 Kathy Hirsh-Pasek

2016
 Robert A. Bjork
 Elizabeth J. Bjork
 Phoebe C. Ellsworth
 Stephen P. Hinshaw

2017
 Gary L. Wells
 Susan T. Fiske

2018
 Richard A. Bryant
 Janet Shibley Hyde
 Richard E. Mayer

2019
 George A. Bonanno
 Roberta L. Klatzky
 Robert J. MacCoun

2020
 Thomas Joiner
 Richard M. Lerner

2021
 Alison Gopnik
 Megan Gunnar
 Saul Kassin

2022
 Mahzarin Banaji and Anthony Greenwald
 Claude Steele
 Laurence Steinberg

See also
 List of psychology awards

References 

Association for Psychological Science
American psychology awards